Men's team table tennis at the 2022 Commonwealth Games was held at the National Exhibition Centre in Birmingham, England from 29 July to 2 August.

Group stage
2 points were awarded for a winning tie, and 1 point for a losing it.

Group 1

Group 2

Group 3

Group 4

Knockout stage

Bracket

Quarterfinals

Semifinals

Bronze medal

Final

References

External links 
 Table Tennis results at Commonwealth Games Birmingham 2022 website – Select Filter by Event - Men's Team

Men's team